It's In There Somewhere is an album by David Thomas Broughton, released in 2007, collating a number of unreleased songs recorded during the previous six years.

Track listing 

"Circle is Never Complete" – 4:05
"Negativity" – 0:32
"Gracefully Silent" – 8:33
"Interlude 1" - 1:52
"I Don't Want to Believe You" - 3:23
"The Heart You Don't Look Out For" - 0:39
"Ain't Got No Sole" - 5:45
"Why Are You Not Here" - 3:45
"Nature" - 6:51
"One Day" - 9:35
"Interlude 2" - 0:30
"So Much Sin to Forgive" - 4:58
"Look What I Have Done" - 6:12

All songs by David Thomas Broughton

2007 compilation albums
David Thomas Broughton albums